Minister of Public Administration, Labour and Social Security of Angola is a cabinet level position in the national government. The position was established in 1980 with Noé da Silva Saúde.

Name changes
 1975–1991: Minister of Labour and Social Security
 1991–present: Minister of Public Administration, Labour and Social Security

Ministers of Public Administration, Labour and Social Security
 –1980: Noé da Silva Saúde
 1980–1986: Horácio Pereira Braz da Silva
 1986–1991: Diogo Jorge de Jesus
 1992–2017: António Domingos Pitra Costa Neto
 2017–2017: António Rodrigues Afonso Paulo
 2017–present: Jesus Faria Maiato

References

External links

 http://www.maptss.gov.ao/

Public Administration, Labour and Social Security
Labour Ministers
Politics of Angola